Sombreros Kiddos is an EP released by the band Sore. It was released in April 2010 under the Pura Pura Record label.

Track listing
 "SillyLittlt Thing" (featuring Atilia Haron)
 "The Hitman" (featuring Mian Tiara)
 "Bogor Biru" (DJ Oreo Remixed)
 "Mata Berdebu"
 "Funk the Hole" (live from Riot on Air Prambors Radio)
 "Apatis Ria"

Personnel
 Ade Firza Paloh - guitar, vocals
 Awan Garnida - bass, vocals
 Ramondo Gascaro, - keyboards, vocals
 Reza Dwi Putranto - guitar, vocals
 Bemby Gusti Pramudya - drums, vocals
 Dono Firman - synthesizer, keyboards, guitar

References 

2010 debut EPs
Concept albums
Sore (band) albums